Follonica is a town and comune (township) of province of Grosseto in the Italian region of Tuscany, on the Gulf of Follonica (Golfo di Follonica), about  northwest of the city of Grosseto.

History
It was founded in 1834 by Grand Duke Leopold II of Tuscany for the workers of a new ironworks plant. However, the area was already settled in Etruscan and Roman times, and a medieval castle (Castello di Valli), whose ruins overlook now  the modern town from a nearby hill, existed since at least 884. Until 1923 it was a frazione of Massa Marittima.

Economy

Tourism
Follonica is a tourist site during the summer, mostly visited by the Italians themselves. The city has been awarded the Bandiera Blu ("Blue Flag") every year from 2000 to 2007 for the cleanliness of its beaches and seawater.

Government

List of mayors

Main sights
Church of San Leopoldo, built by will of duke Leopold II of Tuscany starting from 1836
Castle of Valli, built in the 8th century as residence of the bishops of Lucca; later it was owned by the Aldobrandeschi who, in the 13th century, sold it to the Republic of Pisa. In the 14th century it was a fortress of the Principality of Piombino until, in 1815, it became part of the Grand Duchy of Tuscany.
Pievaccia, remains of a large fortified medieval monastery.

Sport
USD Follonica Gavorrano born of the merger between the teams of Gavorrano and Follonica, militant in Serie D.

Transports
Road
The Via Aurelia highway (SS 1), which runs from Rome to the Franco-Italian border, passes close by the city. 
Train
The railway linking Reggio Calabria in the south and Turin in the north runs through the city, providing direct railway connections to the cities of Grosseto, Rome, Turin, Naples, Pisa and La Spezia, among others.

Sister cities
 Charleroi, Belgium
 Kołobrzeg, Poland
 Hedemora, Sweden

References

External links

 Municipality of Follonica 
 Church of San Leopoldo

Coastal towns in Tuscany
Populated places established in 1834
1834 establishments in Italy
Follonica